Yeniköy is a village in the Silopi district of Şırnak Province in Turkey. The village is populated by Kurds of the Zewkan tribe and had a population of 1,036 in 2021.

The hamlets of Çukurca and Uğurlu are attached to Yeniköy.

References 

Villages in Silopi District
Kurdish settlements in Şırnak Province